The strange big-eared brown bat (Histiotus alienus), is a bat species found in Brazil.

References

Histiotus
Taxa named by Oldfield Thomas
Bats of South America
Mammals described in 1916